Mioproteus is an extinct genus of prehistoric salamanders from Neogene Europe.  Its living relatives are the olm and the mudpuppies.  The species M. caucasicus is from the Middle Miocene.  The species M. wezei first appears in the fossil record during the Pliocene, then disappears during the Middle Pleistocene.

See also
 Prehistoric amphibian
 List of prehistoric amphibians

References

Quaternary amphibians of Europe
Pliocene amphibians
Miocene amphibians
Miocene genus first appearances
Pleistocene genus extinctions
Pleistocene amphibians
Neogene amphibians of Europe
Cenozoic salamanders
Fossil taxa described in 1978
Proteidae
Prehistoric amphibian genera